Pretrž is a settlement east of Peče in the Municipality of Moravče in central Slovenia. The area is part of the traditional region of Upper Carniola. It is now included with the rest of the municipality in the Central Slovenia Statistical Region.

Name
Pretrž was attested in historical sources as Prieters in 1386, Pretesz in 1458, and Preters in 1469, among other spellings.

References

External links

Pretrž on Geopedia

Populated places in the Municipality of Moravče